Pedro Hernández Franco (born 27 August 1993 in Guadalajara, Jalisco) is a Mexican professional footballer who last played for Loros UdeC.

External links
 
Xolos FC Player Profile

Living people
1993 births
Mexican footballers
Chiapas F.C. footballers
Dorados de Sinaloa footballers
Club Tijuana footballers
Correcaminos UAT footballers
Loros UdeC footballers
Liga MX players
Ascenso MX players
Liga Premier de México players
Footballers from Guadalajara, Jalisco

Association footballers not categorized by position